Funifera is a genus of flowering plants in the family Thymelaeaceae, with all species endemic to Brazil.

Species
Species currently accepted by The Plant List are as follows: 
Funifera brasiliensis (Raddi) Mansf.
Funifera ericiflora (Gilg & Markgr.) Domke
Funifera grandifolia Domke
Funifera insulae Nevling

References

Thymelaeaceae
Malvales genera